Preston v. Ferrer, 552 U.S. 346 (2008), was a United States Supreme Court case in which the Court held, 8–1, that the Federal Arbitration Act (FAA) overrules state laws declaring that certain disputes must be resolved by a state administrative agency.

Background 
Alex Ferrer, who plays Judge Alex in a syndicated American courtroom television show, was notified of a demand for arbitration by Arnold Preston, a California attorney. Preston claimed Ferrer owed him fees under a "personal management" contract; in the contract, they had agreed to arbitrate disputes rather than bring them to court. Ferrer then petitioned the California Labor Commissioner, claiming the contract was invalid and unenforceable under California law, as Preston had allegedly acted as a talent agent without a license. Preston argued that he was not acting as a talent agent, and that an arbitrator, not a court, should decide whether this was the case.

Supreme Court 
Oral arguments were heard on January 14, 2008. Joseph D. Schleimer argued on behalf of the petitioner, Arnold Preston, and Eric Brunstad, Jr. argued on behalf of the respondent, Alex Ferrer.

Opinion of the Court 
Citing Southland Corp. v. Keating, the Court noted that it had ruled consistently that the FAA was "a national policy favoring arbitration" when parties contract to settle disputes in that manner, and that it "foreclose[s] state legislative attempts to undercut the enforceability of arbitration agreements." Citing two other previous Supreme Court rulings, the Court also noted that challenges to the validity of an entire contract are subject to the arbitration agreed to in the contract. Ferrer's argument was "unconvincing", the Court ruled, that state law required the exhaustion of administrative remedies before arbitration would commence.

Dissenting opinion 
In a 4-sentence dissent, Justice Clarence Thomas wrote, "As I have stated on many previous occasions, I believe that the Federal Arbitration Act ... does not apply to proceedings in state courts."

See also
 List of United States Supreme Court cases, volume 552

References

External links
 

United States Supreme Court cases
United States Supreme Court cases of the Roberts Court
United States arbitration case law
2008 in United States case law